Growing Up Twisted is an American  reality television series that premiered on A&E on July 27, 2010. The show follows the life of Twisted Sister vocalist Dee Snider, his wife Suzette to whom he's been married since October 21, 1981, and their four children, Jesse (Born 1982), Shane (Born 1988), Cody (Born 1989), and Cheyenne (Born 1996). The show is similar to Gene Simmons Family Jewels in that it follows a rock star and his family through their everyday lives. Season one ran from July 27, 2010 until August 24, 2010.

Episodes

Season 1 (2010)

External links
 
 

2010 American television series debuts
2010 American television series endings
A&E (TV network) original programming
2010s American reality television series
English-language television shows
Television series by Evolution Film & Tape